Adam McQuaid (born October 12, 1986) is a Canadian former professional ice hockey defenceman. He formerly played in the National Hockey League (NHL) with the Boston Bruins, New York Rangers and Columbus Blue Jackets. McQuaid was known primarily as an enforcer for his physical play and capability as a fighter, often protecting younger or smaller members of the team. He won the Stanley Cup in 2011 with the Bruins.

Playing career

Amateur

McQuaid played major midget hockey in his hometown of Cornwall, Prince Edward Island, for the Cornwall Thunder before playing major junior hockey with the Sudbury Wolves of the Ontario Hockey League (OHL) for four seasons. McQuaid was selected in the second round, 43rd overall, in the 2003 OHL Priority Selection as a 17-year-old overage player. He was undrafted by the OHL the previous season.

After scoring 19 points in his second season with the Wolves in 2004–05, McQuaid returned to the OHL and, in his final season, helped lead the Wolves to the OHL Final against the Plymouth Whalers; the Wolves were defeated in six games.

Professional

He was assigned to Boston's American Hockey League (AHL) affiliate, the Providence Bruins in 2007–08 and scored nine points in his professional rookie season.

He scored his first NHL goal on February 7, 2010, a game-winner against goaltender Jaroslav Halák in a 3–0 win against the Montreal Canadiens at the Bell Centre. During Game 4 of the 2011 Stanley Cup Finals, analyst Pierre McGuire described him as "one tough hombre." In that same final, McQuaid won his first Stanley Cup.

On July 14, 2011, McQuaid signed a three-year, $4.7 million contract with Boston.

In 2010, McQuaid suffered a freak concussion after tripping over his suitcase.

In the 2012–13 season, McQuaid helped the Bruins to the Stanley Cup Final by scoring the game-winning goal against the Pittsburgh Penguins in Game 4 of the Eastern Conference Final. He and the Bruins would end up losing in the Final to the Chicago Blackhawks in six games.

In the 2013–14 season, McQuaid would miss most of the season with an illness.

On June 26, 2015, McQuaid signed a four-year, $11 million contract extension with the Bruins. In a game against the Washington Capitals on January 5, 2016, Capitals forward Zach Sill boarded McQuaid and was suspended two games.

On October 19, 2017, McQuaid was placed on injured reserve after breaking his right fibula in a game against the Vancouver Canucks.

Having played in nine straight seasons with the Bruins and approaching the 2018–19 season, McQuaid was traded to the New York Rangers in exchange for Steven Kampfer, a 2019 fourth-round pick and a conditional seventh-round pick on September 11, 2018. McQuaid added a physical presence on the blueline of the rebuilding Rangers, and recorded 2 goals and 5 points through 36 games. With the Rangers out of playoff contention, and in his final year under contract, McQuaid was traded by the Rangers at the trade deadline to his original draft club, the Columbus Blue Jackets, in exchange for Julius Bergman, and a fourth and seventh round picks in 2019 on February 25, 2019. 
On March 15, 2019 McQuaid scored his first goal as a Blue Jacket, the game-winning goal as they shut out the Carolina Hurricanes, 3–0 in Columbus.

On January 16, 2021, McQuaid officially announced his retirement from professional hockey after 12 seasons.

In August 2021 McQuaid rejoined the Boston Bruins organization as the team’s new player development coordinator.

Personal life
McQuaid is a Christian. McQuaid helped to start a Bible study group when he was with the Boston Bruins.

McQuaid married his girlfriend Stephanie Enserink in 2018.
His sister, Michelle McQuaid, competed at the 2015, 2017, 2018 and 2019 Scotties Tournament of Hearts representing Prince Edward Island. His brother Chad McQuaid is currently a practicing lawyer in Charlottetown, PEI.

Career statistics

References

External links

1986 births
Living people
Boston Bruins players
Canadian ice hockey defencemen
Columbus Blue Jackets draft picks
Columbus Blue Jackets players
New York Rangers players
Ice hockey people from Prince Edward Island
People from Queens County, Prince Edward Island
Providence Bruins players
Sportspeople from Charlottetown
Stanley Cup champions
Sudbury Wolves players